Martin Zvolánek (born 25 June 1974 in Pardubice) is a Paralympian athlete from the Czech Republic competing mainly in category F32/51 discus events.

Zvolánekhas competed in two Paralympics.  His first in 2000 in Sydney was in table tennis where he won a bronze in the singles class 2 and with his team mates won a silver in the team class 1–2.  After missing 2004  he competed in the athletics in 2008 he won a bronze in the combined F32/51 discus and competed in the club throw.

External links
 
 Profile at the South Bohemian University

1974 births
Living people
Czech male table tennis players
Czech male discus throwers
Czech club throwers
Table tennis players at the 2000 Summer Paralympics
Paralympic table tennis players of the Czech Republic
Medalists at the 2000 Summer Paralympics
Paralympic medalists in table tennis
Athletes (track and field) at the 2008 Summer Paralympics
Paralympic athletes of the Czech Republic
Medalists at the 2008 Summer Paralympics
Paralympic medalists in athletics (track and field)
Paralympic silver medalists for the Czech Republic
Paralympic bronze medalists for the Czech Republic
Sportspeople from Pardubice